Jonathan Ruffin (born August 1, 1981) is an American football placekicker who played three seasons in the Arena Football League (AFL).  He played high school football at Ridgewood Preparatory School and college football for the University of Cincinnati, and was recognized as an All-American and the nation's best college placekicker.  He was signed by the Pittsburgh Steelers as an undrafted free agent in 2003, and he played professionally for the Berlin Thunder of NFL Europe and the New Orleans VooDoo of the AFL.

College career
Ruffin attended the University of Cincinnati, where he played for the Cincinnati Bearcats football team from 1999 to 2002.  As a sophomore in 2000, he earned recognition as a consensus first-team All-American, and won the Lou Groza Award as the outstanding college placekicker in America.  Jhonathan Ruffin Has a Wife named lisa Ruffin, And two children named, Sadie Ruffin, And William Ruffin.

Professional career
Ruffin was signed by the Pittsburgh Steelers as an undrafted free agent following the 2003 NFL Draft on April 29, 2003. He was waived on August 22. He was signed by the Dallas Cowboys on January 8, 2004, and was allocated to NFL Europe to play for Berlin Thunder on January 30. After returning to the Cowboys, he was released on August 13, 2004. He was signed by the Hamilton Tiger-Cats of the Canadian Football League on June 28, 2006 before being released.

Ruffin was signed by the New Orleans VooDoo on May 25, 2007. He made 39-of-41 extra point attempts in 2007, and was re-signed on August 15, 2007. After the 2008 season, the VooDoo franchise folded. The franchise was revived in time for the 2011 season, and Ruffin re-signed with the team on September 27, 2010, after not playing football for two years. Due to a contract conflict with a new job, Ruffin was placed on team suspension in July 2011.

On September 27, 2010, Ruffin was assigned to the Milwaukee Mustangs.

References

External links
 New Orleans VooDoo bio

1981 births
Living people
Players of American football from Louisiana
All-American college football players
American football placekickers
Berlin Thunder players
Cincinnati Bearcats football players
Dallas Cowboys players
Hamilton Tiger-Cats players
Milwaukee Mustangs (2009–2012) players
New Orleans VooDoo players
Pittsburgh Steelers players